Beseri may refer to:
Beseri
Beseri (state constituency), represented in the Perlis State Legislative Assembly